Hymenothrix wislizeni, the Trans-Pecos thimblehead, is a North American species of flowering plant in the daisy family. It grows in northwestern Mexico (Baja California, Sonora, Chihuahua) and the southwestern United States (far western Texas, Arizona, New Mexico).

Each head has 15-30 yellow or cream-colored disc flowers surrounded by 8-12 yellow ray flowers.

References

External links
Photo of herbarium specimen at Missouri Botanical Garden, collected in Chihuahua in 1846, type specimen for Hymenothrix wislizeni

Bahieae
Flora of Arizona
Flora of Baja California
Flora of Chihuahua (state)
Flora of New Mexico
Flora of Sonora
Flora of Texas
Flora of the Chihuahuan Desert
Plants described in 1849
Taxa named by Asa Gray